The Kreung (Krung) are an ethnic group that live in Cambodia, mainly in Ratanakiri Province, and relatively small number in Stung Treng, Mondolkiri Province.
There are 22,385 Kreung people in Cambodia as of 2013.

Love hut tradition 

This ethnic group has had a certain popularity because they have a certain originality in the relationships between men and women. Parents build a hut for their 13 to 15-year-old children to discover love and sexuality. Children can stay in this house until their twenties before choosing the person of their heart. It is a practice that is developing less.

See also
 Khmer Loeu

References

External links 

 SECRETS OF THE LOVE HUTS By Fiona MacGregor, Pictures Louis Quail

Ethnic groups in Cambodia
Indigenous peoples of Southeast Asia